Kilindini Harbour is a large, natural deep-water inlet extending inland from Mombasa, Kenya. It serves as the harbour for Mombasa, with a hinterland extending to Uganda. Kilindini Harbour is the main part of the Port of Mombasa, the only international seaport in Kenya and the biggest port in east Africa. It is managed by the Kenya Ports Authority (KPA). Apart from cargo handling, Mombasa is frequented by cruise ships.

Kilindini is a Swahili term meaning "deep down" or "in the depths" in reference to the depth of the channel. Kilindini Harbor is an example of a natural geographic phenomenon called a ria, formed millions of years ago when the sea level rose and engulfed a river that was flowing from the mainland.

History 

Mombasa has a centuries-old history as a harbour city. The Kilindini harbour was inaugurated in 1896 when work started on the construction of the Uganda Railway.

During World War II, while Kenya was a British colony, Kilindini became the temporary base of the British Eastern Fleet from early 1942 until the Japanese naval threat to Colombo, Ceylon (now Sri Lanka) had been removed. Nearby, the Far East Combined Bureau, an outstation of the British code-breaking operation at Bletchley Park, was housed in a requisitioned school (Allidina Visram High School, Mombasa) and had success in breaking Japanese naval codes.

Expansion 
On 29 August 2013, expansion of the port enabled it to handle Panamax Vessels. The project was launched in July 2011 at a cost of $82.15 million by the Kenyan Government and was carried out by China Roads and Bridge Corporation.
The project is to increase the port throughput by 33%, consolidating the leading status of Mombasa as well as Kenya in East Africa.

Dongo Kundu Freeport 
Also underway is the Road Bypass project to link the project area and Mombasa – Lunga Lunga – Nairobi Highway. Known as the Dongo Kundu bypass the projects aim is to ease traffic flow to Kenya's South Coast. Construction is to begin in late 2013.

Lamu Port
However, there is a new international seaport under-construction in Lamu known as the Lamu Port. Lamu Port is to be larger than Kilindini Harbour but the Kenya Ports Authority says that the two ports won't compete but complement each other.

The cost for the Short-term Plan for Lamu Port Project, including the first 3 berths, is estimated to be US$664 million. The First Phase is to be completed by 2016.

Gallery

See also
Historic Swahili Settlements
Swahili architecture

References

External links

Kenya Ports Authority, retrieved 13 December 2022
CODENAME KILINDINI: A Top-Secret Code-breaking Operation, retrieved 13 December 2022
Mombasa was base for high-level U.K. espionage operation, retrieved 13 December 2022
Times obituary of Brian Townend, code-breaker, retrieved 13 December 2022

Swahili people
Swahili city-states
Swahili culture
Transport in Kenya
Ports and harbours of Kenya
Mombasa